Shahid Banda is an area of Pindiali Tehsil, Mohmand Agency, Federally Administered Tribal Areas, Pakistan. The population is 1,837 according to the 2017 census.

Education 

A primary school for boys was founded in 1980. A primary school for girls was founded in 2007.

References 

Populated places in Mohmand District